Charentais Mottin, previously known as the Crottin Charantais is a French soft double-cream cheese made of pasteurized whole cow's milk, produced by Savencia Fromage & Dairy in the town of Saint-Saviol located within the Vienne department.

Its shape is cylindrical, of a height of 4.5 cm for a diameter of 8 cm and an average weight of 200g. It is packaged in paper. Its fat content is of 37% in the finished product and 65% when dehydrated. Its taste is creamy.

It was originally produced in the vicinity of the town of Surgères by the company Charentes lait until 1936. There existed a version of the cheese made with goat milk called the trottin charentais.

See also 
Cheese

References

French cheeses